The Centennial Avenue (Centennial Prospekt) is the main street in the city of Vladivostok, Russia. The avenue is situated in the neighborhood known as the "Soviet" district. Stretching from north to south, it is the longest street in Vladivostok City. It was built in honor of the 100th anniversary of the city in 1960.

It is connected to the federal highway M-60 by a low-water bridge.

Known Buildings
 The "Soviet" District Court
 Police Station of the Soviet region
 "Stroitel" Stadium

See also
List of upscale shopping districts

Footnotes

Shopping districts and streets in Russia
Geography of Vladivostok
Transport in Vladivostok
1960 establishments in the Soviet Union